Yu-Gi-Oh! The Eternal Duelist Soul is a card battle video game based on the Yu-Gi-Oh! franchise. It was developed and published by Konami and released on July 5, 2001 in Japan, October 16, 2002 in the United States for Game Boy Advance. It features a single-player campaign against opponents from the Yu-Gi-Oh! anime as well as a multiplayer head-to-head mode.

It was positively received by critics for its gameplay, although the game's campaign was criticized for its lack of a true story, and the absence of a tutorial mode was noted as an issue for inexperienced players.

Gameplay 

The game transfers the rulebook of the physical card game into digital form, featuring over 800 cards. They can be added by acquiring them from in-game card packs or entering a password found on the physical card. The player has a selection of enemies to battle, and winning a certain number of duels against each group will unlock new booster packs and levels of opponents to face.

Reception 
The game received an aggregate score of 81/100 on Metacritic, indicating "generally favorable reviews".

Craig Harris of IGN rated the game 8/10 points, praising the gameplay as "a lot of fun", calling it "so simple to understand that it almost doesn't need [a tutorial]". However, he criticized the dearth of story in the campaign mode, saying that he wished the characters had more exposition, and noting that the game was "obviously made for already-familiar fans". He also called the game's interface "a little wonky".

Matt Keil of TechTV rated the game 4/5 stars, calling it "by far the best of the Yu-Gi-Oh! games to make it to American shores" at the time of its release, and noting that it was a more faithful adaptation of the card game than previous entries. He also called it much more enjoyable than its predecessors due to the elimination of the star chip system, as well as other limitations on card use and opponent level.

Pocket Games magazine rated the game 8/10, calling it "one for the hardcore Yu-Gi-Oh! players". Marc Saltzman of The Cincinnati Enquirer rated the game 4/5 stars, calling it a "solid pick".

Notes

References 

2001 video games
Digital collectible card games
Game Boy Advance games
Game Boy Advance-only games
Multiplayer and single-player video games
Video games developed in Japan
Eternal